V. Sethuraman (29 October 1984 – 26 March 2020), also known by his stage name Sethu, was an Indian dermatologist, who was the founder and medical director of ZI Clinic, an upscale dermatology clinic in Chennai, Tamil Nadu. He was also an actor who appeared in Tamil language films, first appearing in the comedy film Kanna Laddu Thinna Aasaiya (2013).

Career

Medicine 
Sethuraman studied dermatology at Annamalai University, where he got his MBBS and MD. He then obtained his fellowship from the National Skin Centre in Singapore. In 2016, he launched a skin clinic called ZI Clinic, with guests including actors Bobby Simha, Nithin Sathya, and  Aravind Akash, music director Dharan Kumar, director Venkat Prabhu, and the spiritual Brahmakumari sisters were also present at the launching of the clinic, which opened its second location in Anna Nagar in Chennai on 15 October 2017.

Film 
Sethu had been close friends with the actor Santhanam, who offered him the lead role in the movie, Kanna Laddu Thinna Aasaiya. After the success of KLTA, Sethu agreed to act in   Vaaliba Raja, which retained much of the cast from the previous film including Santhanam, Vishakha Singh, VTV Ganesh, Devadarshini, Pattimandram Raja, and Srinivasan. Sethu portrayed a supporting role in Sakka Podu Podu Raja, marking his third collaboration with Santhanam, VTV Ganesh, and Srinivasan. His next film was 50/50  starring  Sruthi Ramakrishnan, Bala Saravanan, and news anchor Bavithra.

Death 
Sethu died on 26 March 2020 at 8:45 PM due to cardiac arrest.

Filmography 
All films are in Tamil.

References

External links 
 

Place of death missing
Indian male film actors
1984 births
2020 deaths
Male actors in Tamil cinema
Place of birth missing
21st-century Indian male actors
Indian dermatologists